Klipvoor Dam is a concrete gravity type dam located on the Moretele River, 55 km north of Brits, North West, South Africa. It was established in 1970. The main purpose of the dam is to serve for irrigation and its hazard potential has been ranked as high (3).

The Klipvoor Dam is one of the good fishing spots of the Borakalalo Game Reserve, located north of the dam.

See also
List of reservoirs and dams in South Africa
List of rivers of South Africa

References

External links
Borakalalo Accommodation

Crocodile River (Limpopo)
Dams in South Africa
Dams completed in 1970